Konrad von Ammenhausen (born c. 1300) was a Swiss Benedictine monk and priest at Stein am Rhein.
He is primarily known for his Schachzabelbuch, a Middle High German verse translation of the Liber de moribus hominum et officiis nobilum ac popularium super ludo scacchorum by Jacobus de Cessolis, completed in 1337. The work survives in more than 20 manuscripts and was frequently printed in the 16th century.

References 

 Heinz Juergen Kliewer: Die mittelalterliche Schachallegorie und die deutschen Schachzabelbücher in der Nachfolge des Jacobus de Cessolis, (Phil. F., Diss. v. 15. Dez. 1966), Heidelberg 1966
 Das Schachzabelbuch des Jacobus de Cessolis, O. P. in mittelhochdeutscher Prosaübersetzung, Herausgegeben von Gerard F. Schmidt, (Texte des späten Mittelalters; Band 13), Berlin 1961
 Ferdinand Vetter: Das Schachzabelbuch Kunrats von Ammenhausen. Nebst den Schachbüchern des Jakob von Cessole und des Jakob Mennel, (=Bibliothek älterer Schriftwerke der deutschen Schweiz und ihres Grenzgebietes; Serie 1, Ergänzungsband), Frauenfeld 1892
Konrad von Ammenhausen, Das Schachzabelbuch. Die Illustrationen der Stuttgarter Handschrift, In Abbildungen herausgegeben und erläutert von Carmen Bosch-Schairer, (=Litterae; Band 65), Göppingen 1981

External links 
 Richard Forster: Das Schachzabelbuch des Konrad von Ammenhausen (PDF)
 list of mss.

14th-century deaths
Benedictine monks
14th-century writers
Middle High German literature
Swiss Christian monks
Year of birth unknown
14th-century  Swiss Roman Catholic priests
14th-century Christian monks